The Stolp SA-500 Starlet is an American amateur-built aircraft. The aircraft is supplied in the form of plans for amateur construction by Aircraft Spruce & Specialty of Corona, California.

Design and development
The Starlet features a strut-braced parasol wing, a single-seat open cockpit with a windshield, fixed conventional landing gear and a single engine in tractor configuration.

The aircraft fuselage is made from welded 4130 steel tubing, while the wing is made from wood and covered in doped aircraft fabric.

The construction time is estimated to be 1400 hours.

Operational history
By 1998, the company reported that 35 aircraft were completed and flying.

Variants
White WW-1 Der Jäger D.IX A modification to appear as a World War I fighter.

Specifications (SA-500 Starlet)

References

External links

SA500 Starlet
Homebuilt aircraft
Single-engined tractor aircraft
Parasol-wing aircraft